The Wellington Region is a region covering the southern tip of the North Island of New Zealand. The region includes the capital city, Wellington and the cities of Porirua, Lower Hutt and Upper Hutt which together make up the Wellington metro area, as well as the surrounding rural area, the Kapiti Coast to the north, and the Wairarapa region to the northeast. It contains a few small rural primary schools, some small town primary and secondary schools, and a large number of city schools.

In New Zealand schools, students begin formal education in Year 1 at the age of five. Year 13 is the final year of secondary education. Years 14 and 15 refer to adult education facilities.

State schools are those fully funded by the government and at which no fees for tuition of domestic students (i.e. New Zealand citizens and permanent residents, and Australian citizens) can be charged, although a donation is commonly requested. A state-integrated school is a former private school with a special character based on a religious or philosophical belief that has been integrated into the state system. State integrated schools charge "attendance dues" to cover the building and maintenance of school buildings, which are not owned by the government, but otherwise they, like state schools, cannot charge fees for tuition of domestic students but may request a donation. Private schools charge fees to its students for tuition, as do state and state integrated schools for tuition of international students.

The roll of each school changes frequently as students start school for the first time, move between schools, and graduate. The rolls given here are those provided by the Ministry of Education, and are based on figures from  The Ministry of Education institution number links to the Education Counts page for each school.

Kapiti Coast District

Masterton District

Carterton District

South Wairarapa District

Upper Hutt City

Lower Hutt City

Porirua City

Wellington City

Closed schools
Wellington City
Athena Montessori College, Wellington. Closed in February 2009.
Kaiwharawhara Primary School, 1925–1977.
Kingston School, Wellington
 Miramar South School and Strathmore Community School, merged on the Strathmore site in January 2013 to form Kahurangi School.
 Moriah College, state-integrated school.

Lower Hutt City
Children of Hope New Zealand, Wainuiomata. Closed at the end of 2007.
Glendale School, Wainuiomata, merged with Pencarrow School an Glendale site to form Pukeatua School.
Hutt Valley Christian School, Wainuiomata. Closed December 2012.
Kamahi School, merged with Stokes Valley School to form Koraunui School in January 2005.
Manor Park School, Manor Park, Lower Hutt
Otonga School, closed April 1999.
Parkway College, Wainuiomata. Merged with Wainuiomata College to form Wainuiomata High School in January 2002.
Parkway Intermediate School, Wainuiomata. Merged with Wainuiomata on Parkway site to form the new Wainuiomata Intermediate School in January 2002.
Parkway School, Wainuiomata, merged with Sun valley School on Parkway site to form Konini School in January 2002.
Pencarrow School, Wainuiomata, merged with Glendale School on Glendale site to form Pukeatua School in January 2002.
Petone College, Ava. Closed January 1999.
Petone West School, closed 1979. , a Countdown supermarket is under construction on its former site.
St Matthew's School, Wainuiomata, merged with St Patrick's School on St Patrick's site to form St Claudine Thevenet School in January 2003.
St Patrick's School, Wainuiomata, merged with St Matthew's School on St Patrick's site to form St Claudine Thevenet School in January 2003.
Stokes Valley School, merged with Kamahi School on Kamahi site to form Koraunui School in January 2005.
Sun Valley School, Wainuiomata, merged with Parkway School on Parkway site to form Konini School in January 2002.
Wainuiomata College, Wainuiomata. Merged with Parkway College at Parkway site to form Wainuiomata High School in January 2002.
Wainuiomata Intermediate School (old), merged with Parkway Intermediate School on Parkway site to form the new Wainuiomata Intermediate School in January 2002.
Waiwhetu School, closed December 2001.
Wood Hatton School, merged with Wainuiomata Primary School on Wainuiomata Primary site in January 2002.

Upper Hutt City
Brentwood School, Upper Hutt, merged with Trentham School on Trentham site in January 2005.
Brown Owl School, Brown Owl, Upper Hutt, closed April 2003 - which was previously known as Te Marua School until name changed in 1973.
Upper Valley Middle School, a private year 7-10 composite school - closed voluntarily in February 2015.

Kapiti Coast District
 Kapiti Christian School, private full primary school, closed December 2009
 Otaki Health Camp School
 Reikorangi College, private composite school, closed December 2009
 Thomas Kennedy Junior Academy, Paraparaumu. Closed August 2007.
 Presentation College, Paraparaumu - Catholic, closed 1973

Masterton District
Mauriceville West School, closed 15 December 1972 
Bideford School, closed September 2003.
Castlepoint School, closed December 1999.
Homeleigh Christian School, Masterton, closed 2007.
Masterton East School, closed April 2002; site now used by TKKM o Wairarapa.
Okautete School, closed April 2001.
Te Wharau School, closed May 1999.
 In 2003, an extensive review of Masterton district primary schools meant many schools closed and combined to form new schools ready for the beginning of the 2004 school year.
Mikimiki School closed and merged with Opaki School.
Masterton Central School and Harley Street School combined on the Masterton Central site to form Masterton Primary School.
Masterton West School and Cornwall Street School combined on the Masterton West site to form Douglas Park School.
Totara Drive School, Lansdowne School and Hiona Intermediate School combined on the Hiona Intermediate site to form Lakeview School.

Notes

References
Te Kete Ipurangi Ministry of Education website
ERO school and early childhood education reports Education Review Office
Decile change 2007 to 2008 for state & state integrated schools

 
Wellington